Ararat, established as a city of refuge for the Jewish nation, was founded in 1825 by New York politician and playwright Mordecai Manuel Noah, who purchased most of Grand Island, a  island near Buffalo, New York. It failed to be a Jewish city.

Noah led a ceremonious procession to the site and laid a markstone with the sayings in Hebrew and English:
"Hear, O Israel, the Lord our God is one Lord; Ararat, A City of Refuge for the Jews, Founded by Mordecai Manuel Noah, in the Month Tishrei, September 1825 and in the 50th year of American Independence."

The idea did not attract many followers and Mordecai Noah started to advocate the creation of a Jewish state in the Land of Israel, then a part of the Ottoman Empire.

In his short story "Noah's Ark", British author Israel Zangwill retells the story of Ararat.

See also
Zionism
Palestine
 Proposals for a Jewish state

References

External links
 Oytsar Zichronosai, YD Eizenshteyn, NY 1930. (digitized and hosted at hebrewbooks.org)
Mapping Ararat: An Imaginary Jewish Homelands Project Using augmented reality, this project animates Major Mordecai Noah's 1825 unrealized plan to transform Grand Island, New York into Ararat, a "city of refuge for the Jews." 

1825 in Judaism
Jews and Judaism in New York (state)
History of New York (state)
Populated places established in 1825
Zionism in the United States
Settlement schemes in the United States
Jewish settlement schemes